Vladimir Putrash (born 4 April 1970) is a Belarusian former footballer.

Career
Putrash started his senior career with Neman Stolbtsy. In 1993, he signed for Belshina Bobruisk in the Belarusian Premier League, where he made one-hundred and eighteen league appearances and scored forty-eight goals. After that, he played for SFC Opava, SK Jiskra Rýmařov, Metallurg Krasnoyarsk, AES Yelimay Semipalatinsk, Trudovye Rezervy-RIPO Minsk, MTZ-RIPO Minsk, Baranovichi, and Livadiya-Yuni Dzerzhinsk.

Honours
Belshina Bobruisk
Belarusian Cup winner: 1996–97

References

External links 
 “We drank 50 grams of cognac before the match and won 4: 1.” Vladimir Putrash - about Bobruisk football in the 90s
 Sovereign collection. "Belshina"
 
 Teams.by Profile
 

1970 births
Living people
Belarusian footballers
Association football forwards
Belarus international footballers
Belarusian expatriate footballers
Expatriate footballers in Russia
Expatriate footballers in the Czech Republic
Expatriate footballers in Kazakhstan
FC Neman Stolbtsy players
FC Belshina Bobruisk players
SFC Opava players
FC Yenisey Krasnoyarsk players
FC Spartak Semey players
FC Partizan Minsk players
FC Baranovichi players
FC Livadiya Dzerzhinsk players
People from Dobruš District
Sportspeople from Gomel Region